Hospital is the debut studio album by the American musician Gary Young and his backing band Hospital, released in 1994. It was Young's first solo effort after being asked to leave the band Pavement.

Background and recording 
The album was recorded in Stockton, California, at Young's studio. "Geri" is about Young's wife. A video was produced for "Plant Man". Young promoted the album by playing the on 1995 Lollapalooza tour.

Critical reception 
AllMusic described it as "a roller coaster of chaotic and disjointed songs."

Track listing
All songs written by Gary Young, except "Wipe Out" by The Surfaris.

Plant Man - 1:58
1st Impression - 0:54
Mitchel - 1:00
Foothill Blvd. - 1:00
Real Call (No Video) - 1:18
Warren - 2:38
Hospital for the Chemically Insane - 0:30
Birds in Traffic - 4:32
Where Are You At - 1:27
Ralph the Vegetarian Robot - 2:36
Missing in Action - 3:32
Wipe Out (The Surfaris) - 1:24
20th Day - 1:25
Geri - 0:43
Hooks of the Hiway - 5:57
Where Are You At [unlisted] - 1:31
Foothill Blvd. [Alt. version] [unlisted] - 4:20

Personnel

Gary Young's Hospital 
 Gary Young – lead vocals, drums
 Zach Silver – vocals, guitar, violin
 Robin Vanderpool – guitar, synthesizers
 Eric Westphal – bass, vocals, piano
 Kelly Foley – vocals, guitar, keyboards
Robbie Warren – guitar

References

Gary Young (drummer) albums
1994 albums